is one of the 24 wards of Osaka, Japan. "Jōtō" means "east of the castle", referring to Osaka Castle. It was separated from Higashinari and Asahi in 1943, and eastern Jōtō became Tsurumi in 1974. Jōtō-ku has the highest population density of any ward in a city-designated municipality in Japan, and is the only ward with a density that exceeds 20,000 people per square kilometre. When the special wards of Tokyo are also included, it is the sixth densest ward in the country after Toshima, Nakano, Arakawa, Bunkyō and Taitō. In recent years, there has been increased construction of high-rise condominiums in the western and northern parts of the ward, and the population of Jōtō-ku continues to grow.

Education

 Colleges and universities
 Osaka Shin-ai College Joto Campus
 Private schools
 Osaka Shin-Ai Jogakuin (girls' school from preschool to senior high school)

Transportation

Rail 

 West Japan Railway Company (JR West)
 Osaka Loop Line: Kyōbashi Station - Ōsakajōkōen Station
 JR Tōzai Line / Katamachi Line (Gakkentoshi Line): Kyōbashi Station - Shigino Station
 Osaka Higashi Line: JR-Noe Station - Shigino Station
 Osaka Metro
 Tanimachi Line: Noe-Uchindai Station - Sekime-Takadono Station
 Nagahori Tsurumi-ryokuchi Line: Gamō-yonchōme Station - Imafuku-Tsurumi Station
 Imazatosuji Line: Midoribashi Station - Shigino Station - Gamō-yonchōme Station - Sekime-Seiiku Station - Shimmori-Furuichi Station
 Chūō Line: Fukaebashi Station
 Keihan Electric Railway
 Keihan Main Line: Noe Station - Sekime Station

References

External links

  

 
Wards of Osaka